Arsenal Futebol Clube, commonly known as Arsenal, is a Brazilian football club based in Sorriso, Mato Grosso state.

History
The club was founded on 20 September 1991, adopting a similar name, logo and colors as English club Arsenal Football Club. After Sorriso Esporte Clube decided not to participate in the 2002 Campeonato Mato-Grossense Second Level, Arsenal professionalized the club's football department and participated in their first official competition.

Stadium
Arsenal Futebol Clube play their home games at Estádio Municipal Egídio José Preima. The stadium has a maximum capacity of 5,000 people.

References

Association football clubs established in 1991
Football clubs in Mato Grosso
1991 establishments in Brazil